Hyaliodes harti is a species of plant bug in the family Miridae. It is found in North America.

References

Further reading
 

 
 
 
 
 
 
 
 

Miridae
Insects described in 1941